Lois Betteridge (born December 17, 1997) is a Canadian slalom canoeist competing in both canoeing and kayaking competitions. She won the silver medal in the women's slalom C-1 event at the 2019 Pan American Games in Lima, Peru.

In 2018, Betteridge and Yannick Laviolette finished in 6th place in the C-2 mixed event at the 2018 Canoe Slalom World Cup.

References

External links 

 

1997 births
Living people
Sportspeople from Ottawa
Canadian female canoeists
Pan American Games medalists in canoeing
Pan American Games silver medalists for Canada
Canoeists at the 2019 Pan American Games
Medalists at the 2019 Pan American Games
20th-century Canadian women
21st-century Canadian women